Wolvesey Castle, also known as the "Old Bishop's Palace", is a ruined building in Winchester, Hampshire, England that was a bishop's palace, and was briefly fortified during the later years of Henry of Blois, the Bishop of Winchester.

History
The first building on the site, an eyot in the River Itchen known as  Wulveseye or Wulf's island, was constructed around 970 by Æthelwold of Winchester, the Bishop of Winchester from 963 to 984, as his official residence or palace. Winchester came under siege during the Rout of Winchester in 1141 by the Empress Matilda during the period of civil war known as The Anarchy, and held out for three weeks until relieved by Stephen's wife, Matilda. Subsequently Henry, the brother of Stephen, King of England,  enlarged and fortified the palace by building a curtain wall, giving the palace the appearance of a castle.  The fortifications were slighted by Henry II after the death of Henry in 1171.

In June 1216, Oliver fitz Regis defended the castle when it was besieged by Prince Louis of France during the First Barons' War.

The palace was the location of the wedding breakfast in 1554 of Queen Mary and Philip II of Spain. It was destroyed by the Roundheads during the English Civil War in 1646. The ruins are located next to the existing bishop's palace, near to Winchester Cathedral, and are currently owned and maintained by English Heritage.

Palace 
The original palace on the site was built around 970 by Æthelwold of Winchester on a piece of land known as  Wulveseye or Wulf's island, an eyot in the River Itchen east of the cathedral. About 1110, the second Norman bishop, William Giffard, constructed a new hall to the south west.  His successor, Henry of Blois, brother of King Stephen added a second hall to the west between 1135 and 1138.

A new palace in the baroque style was built to the south by Thomas Finch for George Morley in 1684. However, Brownlow North demolished all but the west wing of this palace in 1786. After a variety of different uses the remaining part was refurbished for use once again as the bishop's residence in 1926 by Theodore Woods.

Fortifications 
The palace was the scene for the Rout of Winchester during the period of civil war known as The Anarchy in 1141. The Empress Matilda and Bishop Henry fought for possession of Winchester. The besieged defenders of Wolvesey burnt with fireballs many of the houses of the city, and most of the old town of Winchester was destroyed. Empress Matilda's forces were held off for three weeks (August - September, 1141) until Stephen's wife, Matilda, arrived with reinforcements from London. After the siege, Henry fortified the palace by linking the two Norman halls with a curtain wall which would have finally obliterated any remaining parts of the Anglo-Saxon palace, and gave the place the appearance of a castle.

Henry II is said to have slighted the palace after the death of Bishop Henry in 1171. This did not include the destruction of the residential quarters as many later occupants of the see of Winchester dwelled there in high state. But the gate and portcullis were likely removed and some breaches made in the curtain .

It was once a very important building, and was the location on 25 July 1554 of the wedding breakfast of Queen Mary and Philip II of Spain. The palace was destroyed by Roundheads during the English Civil War in 1646.

The chapel is the only considerable remnant of the south range of the palace, and is still in use, being attached to the palace.

The castle was in close proximity to Winchester city walls, parts of which still exist today

Current ownership 
The extensive surviving ruins are currently owned and maintained by English Heritage. The ruins have had Grade I listed status since 24 March 1950. A fair amount of the curtain wall remains, but nearly all the inner arrangements are gone, though it is possible to make out the hall, in which there is a good round arch and one surviving Norman window.

See also

 Castles in Great Britain and Ireland
 List of castles in England
 Wedding of Mary I of England and Philip of Spain

References

Castles in Hampshire
English Heritage sites in Hampshire
Episcopal palaces of the bishops of Winchester
History of Winchester
Tourist attractions in Hampshire
Grade I listed buildings in Hampshire
Ruins in Hampshire
Ruined castles in England